John Dirne (born 14 September 1981), better known by his stage name John Christian, is a Dutch DJ, record producer and musician.

He has been active since 2012 and is a former student of the Dutch Academy of Music. He was unveiled in January 2013 with his remix of "I Could be the One" which entered the top 100 established by Beatport.

He founded his label Freeway Recordings in November 2015.

Discography

Charted singles

Singles
 2013: Flight 643
 2013: Gunshot
 2014: Speed Of Light (with Sem Thomasson)
 2014: Pinball (with Shermanology and Oliver Rosa)
 2014: Samba (with Klauss Goulart)
 2015: Collage (with Arin Tone and Corey James)
 2015: What
 2015: Down (with Volt & State)
 2015: Brothers (featuring Eric Lumiere)
 2015: Hit 'M Like This (with Jacky Greco)
 2016: Flux (with Mantrastic)
 2016: Infinity 2016 (Tribute) (with Arin Tone)
 2016: Glance To The Future (with TripL featuring Jessy Katz)
 2016: House Of God (with Arin Tone)
 2016: Where Is The Party
 2016: Don't Come Back (with Djs From Mars)
 2017: The Grimm
 2017: Iconic (with Nicky Romero)
 2017: The Sign
 2017: Scream (with Tiësto)
 2017: Back To The Oldskool
 2017: Funkastarz
 2018: How Low (with Vavo)
 2018: I Like It Loud (with Tiësto featuring Marshall Masters and The Ultimate MC)
 2018: The Trip
 2018: The House Is Mine
 2019: Let's Get This Thing Started
 2019: Can You Feel It (with Tiësto)
 2019: Uno
 2019: Technoprime (with Tony Junior)
 2020: Dos
 2022: Rain (with Elize)

Remixes
 2013: Nicky Romero and Avicii - "I Could Be the One" (John Christian Remix)
 2015: MOTi - "Valencia" (John Christian Remix) (Intro Edit) [Included in the compilation of Tiësto, Club Life: Volume Four New York City]
 2016: Andrea Rullo - "Alpha Centauri" (John Christian Edit)
 2017: Tiësto and Diplo - "C'Mon" (John Christian Remix)
 2017: Vavo and Redhead Roman featuring Max Landry - "We Have Won" (John Christian Edit)
 2017: Dave Aude and Luciana - "Yeah Yeah 2017" (John Christian Remix)
 2018: John Christian - "What" (2018 Edit)
 2018: Fedde Le Grand - "Monsta" (John Christian Remix)
 2019: Tiësto - "Grapevine" (John Christian Remix)
 2019: Trobi - "We Can Change (Infinity)" (John Christian Remix)
 2019: Mattn, Klaas and Roland Clark - "Children" (John Christian Remix)
 2019: Madonna, Maluma - "Medellín" (John Christian & DJLW Remix)

References

Notes
 A  Did not enter the Ultratop 50, but peaked on the Dance chart.

Sources

External links
 

Dutch dance musicians
Dutch DJs
Dutch record producers
Living people
Musicians from Amsterdam
Remixers
1981 births